Cy C. Young Jr. (July 23, 1928 – December 6, 2017) was an American athlete who competed mainly in the javelin throw. He is the only American male to earn Olympic gold in the event.

Early life
Young was born and raised in Modesto, California. He suffered from asthma as a boy.

College and athletics
Young dabbled in the javelin at Modesto Junior College, where he attended for two years. He started throwing seriously after entering UCLA in 1948; in 1950 he placed second behind Bud Held at the NCAA championships. He was a member of the Sigma Nu fraternity.

Young graduated from UCLA in 1951.

Young competed at age 24 in the javelin throw for the US at the 1952 Summer Olympic Games in Helsinki, Finland, where he won the gold medal on his birthday.

Young continued to throw during his mid-20s, and four years later prepared to defend his Olympic title. Later in the season, he won his only AAU championship. Because the Olympics were being in held in the Southern hemisphere – where the seasons are "reversed" in comparison to America and Europe – the Summer Games were delayed until late November, which was months after the track & field outdoor season typically ended.

Nonetheless, Young headed to Melbourne, Australia as one of the favorites. Three days before the competition he twisted an ankle which caused him pain as he "planted" his leg to release his throw.

There were 21 throwers from 12 nations entered in the morning qualifying round on Monday November 26. The qualifying distance was set at 66 meters- anyone who threw  or better automatically advanced to the Finals. Young advance to the finals, but was only able to throw 68.64m, well below his normal, good for 11th place.

Honors and awards
Young was "named Southern California's Athlete of the Year for 1952, a competition that included the region's professional athletes as well, and missed winning the Sullivan Award by a single vote."

Young was inducted into the UCLA Athletics Hall of Fame in 1998. He was also inducted into the Modesto Junior College Hall of Fame.

Personal life and demise
Young was a fourth generation farmer who grew walnuts and almonds. He and his wife, Elizabeth, resided in Modesto. A daughter, Jenifer, managed his business matters.

Young died on December 6, 2017 at age 89 due to complications from vascular dementia.

References

1928 births
2017 deaths
Sportspeople from Modesto, California
American male javelin throwers
Olympic gold medalists for the United States in track and field
Athletes (track and field) at the 1952 Summer Olympics
Athletes (track and field) at the 1956 Summer Olympics
Medalists at the 1952 Summer Olympics
Deaths from dementia in California
Deaths from vascular dementia
Track and field athletes from California